Aikawa (written: 相川, 愛川, 愛河, 哀川, 會川 or 鮎川) is a Japanese surname. Notable people with the surname include:

, Japanese women's professional shogi player
, male Japanese popular music artist and composer
, Japanese musician
, Japanese voice actress (real name is Honami Iwata)
, Japanese baseball player
, Japanese composer and actor (also known as Sho Aikawa)
, Japanese screenwriter (born Noboru Aikawa)
Tetsuro Aikawa (born 1954), Japanese businessman
, Japanese businessman, founder and first of the president of Nissan zaibatsu (aka Gisuke Ayukawa)
, Japanese gravure idol and professional wrestler

Fictional characters
, from the anime/OVA series Magic User's Club
, a character in the anime/manga Junjo Romantica
, human guise of Kamen Rider Chalice from the Tokusatsu TV series Kamen Rider Blade
, from the anime/manga series Fancy Lala
, from the Super Sentai series Choujuu Sentai Liveman
, from the Super Sentai series Choujuu Sentai Liveman
, from the manga/anime series Dear Boys
, a Vizard in Bleach
, from the manga/anime series Air Master
, from the anime series Machine Robo Rescue
Rumi & Madoka Aikawa, from the video game series Metal Slug series
, from the hentai video game Triangle Heart
, from the manga series Prunus Girl
, from the manga series Bitter Virgin
, the female chocolatier from the manga and anime series Chocolat no Mahō
, the main protagonist in the manga/anime series Is This a Zombie?

Japanese-language surnames